Museum De Lakenhal is the city museum of fine art and history in Leiden, Netherlands. One highlight is its collection of fijnschilder paintings from the Dutch Golden Age. Just like the city, the museum combines a classical appearance with a contemporary character. The broad collection ranges from early works by Rembrandt van Rijn and Lucas van Leyden's Last Judgement to modern classics of De Stijl and artworks created by contemporary artists such as Claudy Jongstra, Atelier van Lieshout and many others.

History of the building
The museum building was erected in 1640 by Arent van 'Gravesande as a cloth hall (lakenhal in Dutch) – a guild hall for cloth merchants. The museum was founded in 1874 as a stedelijk museum (municipal museum.)

Collections
Like other municipal museums in the Netherlands, it became a repository for municipal art collections. Artifacts from Leiden are on display such as a series of stained glass windows by Willem Thibaut commissioned for the Leiden city hall, are now installed in the stairwells.

On permanent display is also the old inspection room or Staalmeesterskamer where cloth was inspected and the meeting hall where disputes were decided. Four large paintings depicting the cloth industry by Isaac van Swanenburg hang in the same spots on the walls as designed. Similarly, a very grand over-the-mantel piece by Carel de Moor shows the inspectors in a massive wooden frame decorated with their family shields, flanked by a series of three historical allegories of the city of Leiden by Abraham Lambertsz van den Tempel.

The museum hosts a collection of altarpieces and religious artifacts from before the Protestant Reformation that were formally ceded to the state in 1572. The museum also includes a reconstructed statie or Catholic mission station from after the Reformation. Because the Catholic religion was banned, there was no official church and all of the Catholic places of worship in the young Dutch Republic were called mission stations. These were semi-hidden churches that were tolerated and taxed by the state.

The collection also includes A Pedlar Selling Spectacles (Allegory of Sight), one of a series of five, The Senses, by Rembrandt.

The museum was closed for restoration and expansion from 2016 to 2019.

On its reopening in June 2019, and until February 2020, the museum had on display a newly identified painting by Rembrandt, Suffer little children to come unto me, showing Jesus preaching.

References

External links

 Museum website

Gallery

1874 establishments in the Netherlands
Art museums and galleries in the Netherlands
Museums established in 1874
Museums in Leiden
19th-century architecture in the Netherlands